Marzenka Novak (Poland, 2 September 1945 – Buenos Aires, 3 July 2011) was an acclaimed Polish-born Argentine actress.

She was the wife of actor Hugo Arana.

Selected filmography 
 1979: Crazy Love
 1979: The Island
 1987: Made in Argentina
 2002: Assassination Tango
 2003: Imagining Argentina

Television 
 1978: Juana rebelde
 1980: Trampa para un soñador
 1987: Clave de sol
 1991: El árbol azul
 1995: La nena
 1998: La condena de Gabriel Doyle

References

External links 
 

1945 births
2011 deaths
Argentine people of Polish descent
Argentine actresses